Minuscule 899 (in the Gregory-Aland numbering) is a Greek minuscule manuscript of the New Testament, on parchment. Palaeographically it has been assigned to the 11th century.

Description 

The codex contains the text of the Gospels on 208 parchment leaves. It is written in one column of 25-26 lines per page. The headpiece of Luke is missing, there is a lacuna at John 16:5-17:8, and John 21:17-25 is supplemented in another hand.

There is also a division according to the smaller Ammonian Sections (in Mark 241 sections, the last section in 16:20), whose numbers are given at the margin, with references to the Eusebian Canons (written below Ammonian Section numbers).

It contains decorated Eusebian canon tables and illustrations of the evangelists.

It references the Jewish Gospel in a scholion at Matthew 12:40. It contains the Jerusalem Colophon after each of the gospels.

Text 

The Greek text of the codex is representative of the Byzantine text-type, except in John. In the Pericope de Adultera, it does not contain the Apollinarius scholion. According to the Claremont Profile Method, it is a core member of the group Lambda.

The Greek text of this codex is mixed. Aland did not place it in any Category.

History 

The codex is dated by the INTF to the 11th century.

The codex was bought at Venice (along with Minuscule 441) by Johan Gabriel Sparwenfeld in 1678.

The manuscript was added to the list of New Testament manuscripts by Gregory (899e).

It is currently housed at the University of Uppsala (Gr. 4) in Uppsala.

See also 

 List of New Testament minuscules
 Biblical manuscript
 Textual criticism

References

Further reading

External links 
 

Greek New Testament minuscules
11th-century biblical manuscripts